Wolf Bickel (born 6 July 1942, Bensberg) is a German amateur astronomer and a prolific discoverer of asteroids, observing at his private Bergisch Gladbach Observatory, Germany. He is the most successful German discoverer of minor planets.

Biography 

Bickel studied electrical engineering at RWTH Aachen University and finished his studies in 1969. He became enthusiastic about astronomy, when he received a celestial chart and Galilean binoculars as a gift from his grandmother at the age of 16. Bickel began to grind parabolic mirrors to build his own telescopes. In 1995, he built a 0.6-meter aperture telescope and discovered his first minor planet, the main-belt asteroid  the same year. He still uses this self-made telescope as of today.

He lives in Bergisch Gladbach, in the Cologne–Bonn Region of North Rhine-Westphalia, Germany. The Minor Planet Center confused Bickel's home town with the location of his observatory, which is located 30 kilometers from his place of residence. Bickel named 12564 Ikeller an asteroid of the Koronis family, and his one and only named discovery after his wife, Ingeborg Bickel–Keller (b. 1941).

Honors and awards 

The 12-kilometer sized asteroid 4324 Bickel, discovered by American astronomer Laurence Taff in 1981, was named in his honor.

Minor planet discoveries

Official MPC discoveries 

As of 2017, he is credited by the Minor Planet Center (MPC) with the discovery of 665 numbered minor planets during 1995–2010.

Comparison with German discoverers 

In terms of total discoveries, Bickel is the most successful German discoverer of asteroids, ahead of (professional) astronomer Freimut Börngen and the first amateur astronomer to claim this honor in more than 150 years. The comparison was published by Erwin Schwab in the journal of the German astronomical society "Vereinigung der Sternfreunde" in 2013, and applies a different metric than used by the MPC.

List 

This is a list of Wolf Bickel's officially discovered (numbered) minor planets, as credited by the Minor Planet Center.

References

External links 
 Bickel overtakes Börgen as most successful discoverer of minor planets, (German), VdS-Journal Nr. 47

1942 births
21st-century German astronomers
Discoverers of asteroids

20th-century German astronomers
Living people